The 1976 Colorado Buffaloes football team represented the University of Colorado Boulder in the Big Eight Conference (Big 8) during the 1976 NCAA Division I football season. In their third season under head coach Bill Mallory, the Buffaloes compiled an 8–4 record (5–2 against Big 8 opponents), finished in a three-way tie for the Big 8 championship, and outscored their opponents, 305 to 225.  The team played its home games on campus at Folsom Field in Boulder, Colorado.

On New Year's night, Colorado played in the Orange Bowl for the first time in fifteen years, but were defeated  by the Ohio State Buckeyes of the Big Ten Conference.

The Buffaloes earned the Orange Bowl bid because they defeated the other teams involved in the three-way tie for first, Oklahoma and Oklahoma State. CU's next appearance in a bowl game was nine years away.

Colorado defeated Oklahoma for the first time in four years; their next win over the Sooners was thirteen years away.

Schedule

References

External links
University of Colorado Athletics – 1976 football roster
Sports-Reference – 1976 Colorado Buffaloes

Colorado
Colorado Buffaloes football seasons
Big Eight Conference football champion seasons
Colorado Buffaloes football